The 1981 Nivea Tennis Classic, also known as the South Pacific Classic was an Association of Tennis Professionals men's tournament held on outdoor grass courts at the Milton Courts in Brisbane, Queensland, Australia that was part of the  1981 Grand Prix tennis circuit. It was the eighth and last edition of the tournament and was held from 5 October until 11 October 1981. Second-seeded Mark Edmondson won the singles title, his third at the event after 1976 and 1978.

Finals

Singles
 Mark Edmondson defeated  Chris Lewis 7–6, 3–6, 6–4
 It was Edmondson's 3rd singles title of the year and the 6th and final of his career.

Doubles
 Rod Frawley /  Chris Lewis defeated  Mark Edmondson /  Mike Estep 7–5, 4–6, 7–6(7–4)

References

External links
 ITF tournament details

Nivea Tennis Classic
Nivea Tennis Classic, 1981
Sports competitions in Brisbane
Tennis in Queensland
Nivea Tennis Classic 
Nivea Tennis Classic